{{safesubst:#invoke:RfD|||month = March
|day = 17
|year = 2023
|time = 12:55
|timestamp = 20230317125532

|content=
REDIRECT 2022 Indianapolis Colts–Minnesota Vikings game

}}